"Timeless Melody" is a rock song written by Liverpool singer/guitarist Lee Mavers and recorded by Mavers' band The La's.

Music video
The music video contains footage from live shows (parts of which are slowed down), depictions of Egyptian hieroglyphs, a short animated sequence, and clips shot at a studio. The video ends with a view of the night sky with stars forming the name of the band.

Formats and track listings
 All songs written by L.A. Mavers (except where stated).
7" single (GOLAS 4)
Cassette single (LASMC 4)
 "Timeless Melody" – 3:03
 "Clean Prophet" – 1:48

12" single (GOLAS 412)
CD single (LASCD 4)
 "Timeless Melody" – 3:03
 "Clean Prophet" – 1:48
 "Knock Me Down" – 3:16
 "Over" – 5:01 (Mavers/Power)

Personnel
 Lee Mavers – lead vocals and Backing vocals, rhythm guitar
 John Power – bass and backing vocals
 Peter "Cammy" Camell – lead guitar
 Neil Mavers – battery

Chart performance

Cover versions
The Seattle band Pearl Jam covered Timeless Melody in their Binaural Tour on 6/4/2000 when they played at The Manchester Evening News Arena, Manchester, England. During the concert lead singer Eddie Vedder incorrectly stated  that the band was going to play a song written by a band from "your town". The concert is available as an Official Bootleg.  Pearl Jam went on to play the song several more times on the tour, often as a duet with Supergrass frontman Gaz Coombes. Pearl Jam have also performed the song with Death Cab for Cutie in 2004.

References

External links
Official music video

1990 singles
Go! Discs singles
The La's songs
Song recordings produced by Steve Lillywhite
Songs written by Lee Mavers
1990 songs